Tanzel Etric Smart Jr. (born November 6, 1994) is an American football defensive tackle for the New York Jets of the National Football League (NFL). He played college football at Tulane, and was drafted by the Los Angeles Rams in the sixth round of the 2017 NFL Draft.

College career
Smart attended and  played  college football for Tulane University in New Orleans, Louisiana.

Professional career

Los Angeles Rams
Smart was drafted in the sixth round with the 189th overall pick by the Los Angeles Rams in the 2017 NFL Draft.

On May 15, 2020, Smart was released by the Rams.

Buffalo Bills
On August 16, 2020, Smart signed with the Buffalo Bills. He was waived on September 5, 2020.

Cleveland Browns
On September 11, 2020, Smart was signed to the Cleveland Browns practice squad. He was released by the Browns on September 22, 2020.

New York Jets
On October 14, 2020, Smart was signed to the New York Jets' practice squad. He was elevated to the active roster on November 9 and December 19 for the team's weeks 9 and 15 games against the New England Patriots and Los Angeles Rams, and reverted to the practice squad after each game. He was promoted to the active roster on January 2, 2021.

On August 31, 2021, Smart was waived by the Jets and re-signed to the practice squad the next day. He signed a reserve/future contract with the Jets on January 10, 2022.

On August 30, 2022, Smart was waived by the Jets and signed to the practice squad the next day. He signed a reserve/future contract on January 9, 2023.

References

External links
Tulane Green Waves bio
Los Angeles Rams bio

1994 births
Living people
American football defensive tackles
Players of American football from Baton Rouge, Louisiana
American football defensive ends
Tulane Green Wave football players
Los Angeles Rams players
Buffalo Bills players
Cleveland Browns players
New York Jets players